Florence Greenberg (September 16, 1913 – November 2, 1995) was an American record label owner, music executive, and record producer. Greenberg was the founder and owner of Tiara Records, Scepter Records, Hob Records, and Wand Records. She is best known for her work as a record producer and music executive for several popular singers in the 60s including Dionne Warwick, the Shirelles, Tammi Terrell, Chuck Jackson, and B.J. Thomas.

Early life and career 
Greenberg — once a Republican campaign worker — lived as a housewife in Passaic, New Jersey. In the mid-1950s, she was in her mid-40s with two children, Mary Jane and Stanley, who were both in school, so she had nothing to do at home during the day.

Career (1956 - 1976) 
By 1956, a 43-year-old Greenberg was desperately searching for an escape from the suburban lifestyle that accompanied her being a housewife. She did not know what she wanted to do but could often be seen hanging out at the Turf restaurant in New York City as she was enamored with the atmosphere surrounding the Brill Building. A friend of her husband's, Freddy Bienstock, helped her to get in the record business by one day inviting her over to the Hill & Range Music offices when he was working with his cousins Jean and Julian Aberbach. Greenberg was a natural and immediately began exploring her options of career paths in the music industry.

In 1958, she started her own record label, called Tiara Records. After a performance by a group of girls at Passaic High School in 1957, Greenberg's daughter Mary Jane convinced her that she had to hear the group sing. She signed the group—popularly known as the Shirelles—to Tiara after they auditioned for Greenberg in her living room.

The first song recorded and released on the Tiara Records label was "I Met Him on a Sunday," the Shirelles' talent show song that grabbed the attention of Greenberg in the first place. Just as the record started to break locally, Greenberg sold the company with the Shirelles' contract to Decca Records for $4,000. However, she started a new label in 1959, called Scepter Records, which became one of the leading independent record labels in the 1960s. Under Scepter Records, Greenberg re-signed the Shirelles, becoming their manager once again. In 1961, Greenberg launched another record label, called Wand Records, as a subsidiary of Scepter Records.

In 1963, the Shirelles learned that a trust, holding their royalties, that they allegedly were promised by Greenberg and Scepter, and supposed to receive on their 21st birthdays, did not exist. In response, they left the label, and later filed a breach of contract suit against the company. Scepter met this with a countersuit for quitting; both suits were withdrawn in 1965, after an agreement was reached.

It is said that Greenberg was a "a white woman who was in a black business,” and Scepter did not truly begin to see success until Greenberg began her partnership with Luther Dixon. Once confirming their financial partnership, Greenberg became exclusively in charge of the business development of the label while Dixon managed Scepter's publishing and artistic production. Around this same time, she moved her labels' offices into the offices of 1650 Broadway: the home of Aldon Music. Due to its close proximity, 1650 Broadway shared many songwriters and artists (such as Carole King and Gerry Goffin) with the Brill Building.

In 1965, Greenberg received an offer of $6 million for Scepter from Gulf+Western, an offer that she rejected and later regretted not accepting. Greenberg retired from business in 1976, and sold all of her labels to Springboard International.

Notable work 
Greenberg's labels produced some of the most applauded and awarded songs of the Brill Building era including: 
 "Dedicated to the One I Love" - the Shirelles
 "I Don't Want To Cry" - Chuck Jackson
 "Louie Louie" - the Kingsmen
 "Raindrops Keep Fallin' On My Head" - B.J. Thomas (featured in Butch Cassidy and the Sundance Kid and subsequently the winner of the Academy Award for Best Original Song)
 "Soldier Boy" - the Shirelles (a Florence Greenberg composition) 
 "Tonight's the Night" - the Shirelles
 "Twist and Shout" - The Isley Brothers
 "Walk On By" - Dionne Warwick
 "Will You Love Me Tomorrow" - the Shirelles (the first girl group single to reach Number One on the charts)

Personal life 
Greenberg was married to an accountant with whom she had two children, Mary Jane (Greenberg) Goff and Stanley Greenberg. At the time of her death, she was a grandmother to six and had five great-grandchildren.  Her son-in-law, Sam Goff, is a managing partner in Essex Entertainment. She was of Jewish descent.

Death and legacy 
Greenberg died on November 2, 1995, of heart failure at Hackensack University Medical Center. She was 82 and lived in Teaneck, New Jersey.

In 2011, a Broadway show based on Greenberg's life called Baby It's You! debuted starring Beth Leavel as Greenberg. Prior to the show’s opening, a lawsuit was filed “seeking damages on behalf of performers Beverly Lee of The Shirelles, Dionne Warwick and Chuck Jackson, as well as the Estates of Doris Coley Jackson and Addie Harris Jackson, for the unauthorized use of their names and likenesses.”

References

1913 births
1995 deaths
Record producers from New Jersey
People from Passaic, New Jersey
People from Teaneck, New Jersey
20th-century American businesspeople
20th-century American businesswomen
American women record producers
American people of Jewish descent